Jiang Xiao (born ) is a Chinese male  track cyclist, riding for the national team. He competed in the individual pursuit and team pursuit event at the 2010 UCI Track Cycling World Championships.

References

External links
 Profile at cyclingarchives.com

1987 births
Living people
Chinese track cyclists
Chinese male cyclists
Place of birth missing (living people)
Cyclists at the 2010 Asian Games
Asian Games medalists in cycling
Medalists at the 2010 Asian Games
Asian Games bronze medalists for China
21st-century Chinese people